St.Joseph Shrine of Panagudi is under the Diocese of Tuticorin in Tamil Nadu. Approximately 850 families are in this Catholic parish. Many people from southern Tamil Nadu made pilgrimage to this holy shrine of St.Joseph. They reported many miraculous cures and believe to get much more every time.

Saint Joseph 

Saint Joseph is the Patron saint of Panagudi Shrine parishioners. He is called in the name in Tamil 'Punitha Soosaiyappar' (புனித சூசையப்பர்) and also 'Valanaar' (வளனார்) here. He is the foster father of Jesus Christ and husband of virgin Mary. He is a descendant of King David of Israel. He was a carpenter who made many wooden articles. He is the head of Holy Family. He is the Patron of the Universal Church, Chastity, Education, Workers, Marriage, Families, and Peaceful Death.

History 
In the 1870s Fr. Gregory, bought 5 acres of land and built a small Church in honor of St.Joseph. That church was renovated through 1891 to 1892. On those days this church is under the Kaavalkinaru parish. In 1938, Brothers of Sacred Heart start a school in Panagudi. Panagudi was established as an independent Parish on 24 December 1939. Fr.Soosainather was the first parish priest of this church. Parish priest's House was built in his time. In 1945, convent of the Sisters of Servites of Mary established under the guidance of Fr.Devota. In 1947, Fr. Remigius founded a 36 feet stone pillar for flag hoisting. In 1954, Fr. Xavier started the Legion of Mary. In 1962, Fr. Lourdhumani made the Decorative Car for Saint Joseph. Fr. Devasagayam Fernando (1969–72), formed the Welfare Association of Saint Joseph. In the period of Fr. Sengolmani(1972–81), the current church was built and consecrated by Bishop of Tuticorin Rev. Amalanather. In 1990, Fr. Paneerselvam built the grotto of Our Lady of Vailankanni. The same year Sisters of St. Anne start an English medium school in Panagudi. In 1995, Fr. Devasagayam raised the statue of Sacred Heart at the top of the Church tower and he built a stage called Valanaar Kalaiyarangam. In 2001, Fr. John Bosco celebrated the Silver Jubilee of this church. Saint Joseph church was elevated to a Shrine status on 5 December 2001 when Fr. Isidore was the parish priest. Fr. Thomas is the present Parish Priest.

Events 
New Year celebrations: 1 January of the every year, various competitions held and the winners honored with worthy prizes.

Wednesdays: The day devoted to St.Joseph is celebrated by evening mass. First Wednesday of every month also has special morning mass.

March: The month dedicated for St.Joseph, celebrated by the parishioners.

Food Feast: Every year, on Wednesday of the holy week Food feast is celebrated; dinner is distributed to the people.

Shrine Festival: From 22 April to 1 May St.Joseph's festival is celebrated with great devotion.

References

Churches in Thoothukudi district
Roman Catholic shrines in India
Roman Catholic churches in Tamil Nadu
Roman Catholic churches completed in 1976
20th-century Roman Catholic church buildings in India